Hanife Çetiner (1938 – 10 January 2011) was a Turkish fashion designer.

A painting and home economics teacher, Çetiner started her career in fashion in 1990 and later became the main designer for the 67th Miss Turkey competition, creating 134 outfits for the contestants. Her designs were prepared by using Turkish motifs and were presented at competitions such as Miss Universal, Miss World, Miss Europe, and Miss International. A number of them won the "Best In Evening Gown" and "National Costume" awards, 9 and 4 times in total respectively. In 1998, she organized the first ever fashion show in Şırnak and exhibited a collection of her shawls under the title "İzmir'den Şırnak'a Sevgi Bağları".

Hanife Çetiner died on 10 January 2011 in İzmir after suffering a heart attack. Her body was interred at the Balçova Upper Cemetery.

During her career, Hanife Çetiner took part in many activities with non-governmental organizations. In 1995, together with Ege Orman Foundation she initiated the charity event 'Ateşsiz Piknik'. Starting from May, every year she tried to spread the news about this event by organizing picnics with different NGOs and schools.

References 

1938 births
2011 deaths
Turkish fashion designers
Turkish women fashion designers
People from Çanakkale